Fancy Nancy (titled Fancy Nancy Clancy internationally) is an American computer-animated children's television series developed by Jamie Mitchell and Krista Tucker and produced by Disney Television Animation for Disney Junior based on the eponymous children's picture book series by Jane O'Connor with illustrations by Robin Preiss Glasser. The show follows the adventures of Nancy Clancy, a 6- (and then later 7-) year-old girl who loves everything fancy and French while living with her family and friends in a fictional version of Plainfield, Ohio.

The series premiered on July 13, 2018 in the United States and in Canada the following day. Disney Junior renewed the series for a second season, which premiered on October 4, 2019 in the United States.

On September 18, 2019, a third season was commissioned, and Krista Tucker confirmed that it would be the last for the entire series. The third season began simulcasting on Disney Junior, DisneyNOW and Disney+ on November 12, 2021. The series finale aired on February 18, 2022.

Plot
Six-year-old Nancy Clancy enjoys fancy and French things that range from her outfit to her creative elaborate attire as she plans to teach some fanciness to her ordinary family and her friends.

Characters
 Nancy Margaret Clancy "Fancy Nancy" (voiced by Mia Sinclair Jenness) is a little girl who enjoys fancy things and is a bit of Francophile; she loves France and can speak French. She was 6 years old until the episode "Nancy's Parfait Birthday!", where she turned 7. Her favorite color is fuchsia, and she adores butterflies; she has an adorable poodle named Frenchy, her own secret delivery mailbox to share all her party invitations with her best friend Bree, and own playhouse. She also has a doll named Marabelle and sometimes carries her everywhere. Her mother sometimes uses her full name when she is in trouble. Her middle name is Margaret after her late maternal grandmother. In "Paris, Adieu!", Nancy and her family start saving money in hopes of eventually affording to visit Paris; she finally completes her goal in the series finale.
 Josephine Jane "JoJo" Clancy (voiced by Spencer Moss) is Nancy's little sister. She has an imaginary friend named Dudley, is a PIT (Pirate in Training), loves to help, is 3 years old but she turned 4 in "Big Top Nancy", laughs a lot, and loves her stuffed animal "Mr. Monkey".
 Doug and Claire Clancy (voiced by Rob Riggle and Alyson Hannigan respectively) are Nancy's parents.
 Mrs. Dolores Devine (voiced by Christine Baranski) is Nancy's elderly widowed neighbor. Her name is a play on the word "divine". Her late husband's name is Ronnie.
 Frank Anderson (voiced by George Wendt) is Nancy's widowed maternal grandfather. He fixes a leaky pipe in "Nancy Goes to Work" where he's called "Grandpa Frank". His late wife was named "Margaret".
 Frenchy (voiced by Fabio Tassone) is Nancy's poodle.
 Poppy (Sid Clancy) (voiced by John Ratzenberger) is Nancy's paternal grandfather. He is a professor of geology. Grammy and Poppy live in Chicago. 
 Grammy (Fay Clancy) (voiced by Miriam Flynn) is Nancy's paternal grandmother. Nancy often thinks she’s a spy when she's actually a librarian who works for the government. 
 Briana Rose "Bree" James (voiced by Dana Heath) is Nancy's best friend. She is Nancy's next-door neighbor, loves nature, is a fantastique ice skater; she has a dog named Waffles, and has a doll named Chiffon.
 Freddy James (voiced by Blake Moore) is Bree's younger brother and JoJo's best friend. He is 3 years old.
 Calvin and Gloria James (voiced by Geno Henderson and Tatyana Ali respectively) are Bree's parents.
 Mrs. Priya Singh (voiced by Aparna Nancherla) is Doug's accountant agency boss. 
 Mr. Ravi Singh (voiced by Kal Penn) is Priya's husband.
 Jonathan (voiced by Ian Chen) is Nancy's cousin who also enjoys fancy stuff. Prior to the series, he went by "Johnny", but now he goes by "Jonathan". He's a magician and loves clothes.
 Gus (voiced by Chi McBride) is a local courier who makes deliveries. He can be quite goofy at times and a bit clumsy. He also hates lying and being dishonest. In the episode "Parcel Pursuit" he loses his kitten Parcel while on his mail route. 
 Lionel (voiced by Malachi Barton) is a boy who is a bit of a comedian. Lionel has curly blond hair and has blue eyes. He also has a dog named Flash and a rubber chicken named Bok-Bok, which he carries with everywhere he goes, that he got to get over the chicken incident that happened when he was younger. He has an autistic cousin named Sean that he cares for in the episode "Nancy's New Friend", which he teaches Nancy to be calm around him. In the episode "Love, Lionel", he had a huge crush on Wanda and had trouble making his feelings known to her, as she and her other friends already know him for his cracking of jokes and where Nancy tries to help him get over it and come clean.
 Sean (voiced by George Yionoulis) is Lionel's cousin who is autistic. He loves trains and is really educated about them.
 Brigitte (voiced by Madison Pettis) is Nancy's favorite waitress who always serves her and her friends and family their favorite pizza at the pizza parlor. She is also her and JoJo's babysitter. In the third season, Brigitte moves to Chicago to go to college.
 Grace White (voiced by Hannah Nordberg) is Nancy's frenemy. She is from a wealthy family. Grace often brags about what she has, which can sometimes annoy the other kids. In the Season 3 episode, "Grace Gets Real", however, Grace finally learns how to be humbler and not brag.
 Rhonda and Wanda (both voiced by Ruby Jay) are identical twin sisters who are Nancy's friends and Lionel has trouble telling them apart. They love to play sports. They both wear bows on their heads, each with their own pattern with Rhonda's bow having stripes and Wanda's having polka dots. They also have the first letter of their names on the side at the top of their shirts to tell them apart. They are both tomboys and they love to play sports in their backyard, and when they go to practice.
 Roberto (voiced by Nathan Arenas) is Nancy's friend and Lionel's new Buddy who just moved to their neighborhood from Paris, Texas in the episode "Le Boy Next Door."
 Daisy (voiced by Darci Lynne) is Nancy's friend that she met at a Food Drive.
 Lucille (voiced by Rachael MacFarlane) is Nancy's dance teacher. 
 Mr. Chen (voiced by James Sie) is the shoe store owner and judge for the Plainfield ballroom dance competition. 
 Flash is Lionel's dog.
 Waffles is Bree's dog.
 Serena and Venus are Rhonda and Wanda's pet hamsters. They are named after the famous tennis-playing sisters, Serena and Venus Williams.
 Fritters is Grace's pet bunny.
 Pepper is Grace's pet pony.
 Dumpling is Grace's silky pet Chicken.
 Jean Claude is JoJo's fish that died and had a funeral in the episode "Au Revior Jean Claude".
 Jean Claude Jr. is Nancy and JoJo's fish that they got in the episode "Au Revior Jean Claude" after Jean Claude died.
 Marabelle is Nancy's favorite doll.
 Chiffon is Bree's favorite doll.  
 Bok Bok is Lionel's favorite toy chicken that he likes to be funny with and makes jokes with. He carries him everywhere and got him when he was younger to get over the chicken incident.
 Penelope is Grace's favorite doll who looks identical to her.
 Flower Shop Owner is a kindly middle-aged woman who owns the Flower Shop and invites Nancy and Bree to participate in the poetry contest.

Episodes

Release 
The series premiered on July 13, 2018 in the United States and in Canada.

Home media

Reception

Critical reception 
Alex Reif of LaughingPlace.com called Fancy Nancy "full of bright colors, fun characters, and musical numbers," asserting, "Like the beloved book series, kids are going to think Disney’s Fancy Nancy is très magnifique. Nancy will inspire viewers to be themselves and to make every day extra special. Her interests gravitate towards things that are pink and sparkly, but her personality is optimistic and friendly. Not only will kids expand their vocabulary, but they will also see a great role model for overcoming personal struggles and being a better friend." Emily Ashby of Common Sense Media gave Fancy Nancy a grade of 4 out of 5 stars, complimented the educational value, citing self-expression and individuality, and praised the depiction of positive messages and role models, stating the show promotes respect and positivity across its characters.

Accolades

References

External links

Disney Junior original programming
2010s American animated television series
2020s American animated television series
2010s preschool education television series
2020s preschool education television series
2018 American television series debuts
2022 American television series endings
English-language television shows
American preschool education television series
Animated preschool education television series
Television series by Disney Television Animation
American television shows based on children's books
American children's animated adventure television series
American children's animated fantasy television series
American computer-animated television series
Animated television series about children